The  is a supermini car (B-segment) produced by Suzuki. The vehicle is classified as a B-segment marque in the European single market, a segment referred to as a supermini in the British Isles. Prior to this, the "Swift" nameplate had been applied and purchased from Swift Engineering (previously known as Swift Cars) to the rebadged Suzuki Cultus in numerous export markets since 1983 and became its own model since 2004. Currently, the Swift is positioned between Ignis and Baleno in Suzuki hatchback global lineup.

Predecessors

International (1983–2003) 

The Suzuki Swift began in 1983 as a marketing and manufacturing rebadge of the Suzuki Cultus, a supermini (or subcompact) manufactured and marketed worldwide across three generations and four body configurations—three-door hatchback, four-door sedan, five-door hatchback and two-door convertible—and using the Suzuki G engine family.

The Swift was marketed in the Japanese domestic market (JDM) as the Cultus and elsewhere as the Suzuki Swift, Suzuki Forsa, Chevrolet Swift, Chevrolet Sprint and Sprint Metro, Geo and Chevrolet Metro, Pontiac Firefly, Maruti 1000, Holden Barina and Subaru Justy. Versions of the second generation Cultus were also produced until 2007 in India and the car remains in production until 2016 in Pakistan and China. For more information on the initial versions of the Swift, see: Suzuki Cultus.

Japan (2000–2006) 

In Japan, the Swift nameplate was introduced in 2000 as a replacement for the Suzuki Cultus. Outside Japan, the "Suzuki Ignis" name was used. Both three- and five-door hatchback body styles were offered, although the three-door was not offered as part of the regular lineup in Japan.

The Swift was powered by a new generation of Suzuki inline-four gasoline engines, the M family. Engine displacements of 1.3- and 1.5-litres were offered, both with a five-speed manual transmission or optional four-speed automatic. The vehicle was available with either front- or four-wheel drive. Vehicles fitted with the 1.3-litre engine were designated HT51S, with the 1.5-litre version assigned HT81S.

The three-door body variant formed the basis of the Swift Sport in Japan, or Ignis Sport in export markets. Introduced in 2003, it featured redesigned bumpers and was fitted with a higher-output version of the 1.5-litre engine, producing . The Sport ceased production in 2005, with the regular Swift (1.3-liter SE-Z trim) remaining until 2006 and sold side by side with the first generation global version Swift since November 2004.

First generation (RS; 2004)

RS413/413D/415 

The global version of the first generation Swift was debuted at the Paris Motor Show in September 2004. The design of the Swift was previewed on the Concept S and Concept S2 concept cars at auto shows, in the years leading up to its launch. This generation of the Swift marked a significant departure with the previous Cultus-based models, with Suzuki redesigning the vehicle as less of a "low price alternative" subcompact and more of a "sporty" subcompact. The Swift's design and driving characteristics focused on the European market with its chassis refined through a road-testing program across Europe.

The first generation Swift has received four stars out of five ratings in the Euro NCAP crash tests. It also was awarded 2006 Semperit Irish Car of the Year in Ireland.

Since its global launch in 2005, which was kicked off with a marketing campaign fronted by the footballer Cristiano Ronaldo in many European countries, the Swift has recorded above forecast sales in most markets. In Japan, sales figures have been twice the forecast and in many European markets, the model has been a runaway success.

It was produced in Hungary, India, Indonesia, Japan, Pakistan and by Chang'an Motors in China. In most markets, only the five-door body is available, and a four-wheel drive is an option for the 1.3- and 1.5-litre petrol engines. A  1.2-litre engine fitted with an automatic continuously variable transmission (CVT) was offered in front-wheel drive only. In Europe, the Swift was launched in three- or five-door hatchback forms, with 1.3- and 1.5-litre petrol engines, and a 1.3-litre DDiS turbodiesel engine supplied by Fiat.
Both the 1.3-litre and 1.5-litre petrol models are available with four-wheel drive and hold the chassis numbers, ZD11S and ZD21S.

Pak Suzuki Motor Company Limited started producing the first generation Swift in November 2009 and only available with 1.3-litre M13A petrol engine and paired with either 5-speed manual or 4-speed automatic transmissions. The first generation Swift was discontinued in Pakistan in August 2021.

In Indonesia, the earlier Swift was imported from Japan and from 2007 to 2011, it was assembled locally at Suzuki Indomobil Motor's production plant in Bekasi, West Java. It was only offered with a 1.5-litre M15A petrol engine, mates with either 5-speed manual or 4-speed automatic transmissions. There were several special editions with Swift Sport bumpers, sold as GT (2007), GT2 (2009) and GT3 (2010), respectively. There was also a special edition called GTS with body kits launched in July 2009.

The Maruti Suzuki Swift was launched in India on 25 May 2005 with the familiar 1.3-litre SOHC 16-valve G13BB petrol engine seen in Maruti Esteem. Later, in early 2007, Maruti introduced the Swift with a Fiat-sourced 1.3-litre Fiat's DDiS turbo-diesel engine. In 2010, due to the new BS-IV emission norms, Maruti replaced the 1.3-litre petrol engine with the more modern 1.2-litre DOHC (later model has VVT) K12M engine.

Changan Suzuki Swift 
Suzuki's joint venture in China, Changan Suzuki, started producing  Swift for the Chinese domestic market in Chongqing from July 2005. Two petrol engines were available; 1.3-litre SOHC G13BB engine producing  and 1.5-litre DOHC VVT M15A engine producing . Both engines are mated with a 5-speed manual transmission, while the later was available with a 4-speed automatic transmission option. A limited edition Swift with new sporty bumpers called Champion Edition was introduced in June 2010.

While the new generation Swift was prepared for the global market, Changan Suzuki continued producing this generation by giving its first facelift by using Swift Sport bumpers and rear lights in October 2010, skipped the 2007 facelift for the global market model. Suzuki did testing the new generation Swift in China but decided only offered the Japanese imported high performance Swift Sport instead.

The second facelift occurred in 2013 and it has similar front bumper styling as the refreshed second generation Swift.

The sales was axed when Suzuki decided to withdraw from Chinese market to focus in India in September 2018. Over 350.000 units Swift were sold in China from 2005 to 2019.

Swift Sport (RS416; 2005-2012) 
In September 2005, Suzuki launched the Sport version of the new Swift in Japan, and in September 2006 the model was introduced in most European markets. Named "Swift Sport", it is powered by an enhanced M16A unit, a high-revving 1.6-litre, naturally aspirated DOHC VVT four-cylinder engine with an 11.1:1 compression ratio, high lift cams, forged pistons, and strengthened valve springs. The 1.6-litre engine produces  and  torque. At , the car is  longer than the standard Swift. The Swift Sport features sportier bumpers and spoilers, a stiffer suspension, twin exhaust pipes, red sport seats (with Recaro seats optional) and four-wheel disc brakes on 16-inch wheels. The European Swift Sport features five-speed manual transmission, the three-door body variant, 17-inch wheels (16-inch also available) and electronic stability control (ESC).

In July 2008, Suzuki Germany launched a limited edition of Swift Sport called N'Style Rally to pay tribute to the Suzuki's Group N Junior World Rally Championship car and only limited to 500 units. It was offered exclusively in black and is covered with Suzuki Motorsport’s logos and decals.

In 2007, Suzuki Arena Kyoto Ragunan, a Suzuki's dealership based on Kyoto prefecture, collaborated with Japanese car tunner Tommykaira to modified Swift Sport. The car is called Tommykaira S-Ss (Super Swift Sports).

Engines

Safety 
 Euro NCAP (2005) - 
 ANCAP (2005, variants with side curtain airbags) -

Second generation (AZG; 2010)

AZG412/413D/414 

The second generation Swift was unveiled on 26 August 2010. It went on sale in Japan on 18 September 2010. The second generation Swift production at Suzuki's plant in Hungary started on 11 June 2010 to be supplied across Europe. The new car has its wheelbase extended by 50 millimeters over the previous generation and has many visual updates. While the new car looks different from the old one, its design is an evolution of the radical first generation styling with a longer and more rounded appearance. During September 2010, Suzuki in the United Kingdom released the second generation Swift onto British roads.

The new generation is expected to feature a 1.2-litre VVT petrol engine (K12B) developing . In some countries, the second generation of Suzuki Swift uses a 1.4-litre VVT petrol engine (K14B) which produces .

In Thailand, the Swift is built locally since March 2012 and is part of the Thai government's eco-car program. The car is sold with a CVT automatic transmission on GA, GL and GLX variants; GA and GL variants are also offered with a five-speed manual transmission without anti-lock brakes. Another variant with Japanese market RS body kit was later added as RX trim.

For the Indonesian market, the Swift was launched on 20 September 2012 at the 20th Indonesia International Motor Show and sold in two trim levels, GL and GX, with manual or automatic transmission. The GS trim level was added on 6 June 2015, which was launched at the 2015 Jakarta Fair. Sales of the Swift in that market were ended in April 2017. It was replaced by the Baleno hatchback in August 2017, which is slightly bigger and positioned in the same class as the Swift, as the third generation Swift is not released in that market.

For the Malaysian market, the Swift was released in January 2013, imported from Thailand. It is available with three trim levels; GL, GLX and GLX-S. The CKD version was later launched in May 2013. A limited edition called RS based on GLX trim with GLX-S' body kit, decals and red accents interior was launched later in June 2014. The facelifted model launched in July 2015 and followed by RR2 special edition based on GL trim in September.

2013 update 
For 2013, Suzuki updated the Swift with some minor cosmetic changes such as a revised front bumper, L-shaped LED daytime running lights on the foglamp housings, fresh 16-inch wheels, LED-type high-level brake lamp and new seat fabric design.

For the Japanese market, it features Suzuki's newly developed DUAL JET ENGINE as well as Suzuki's ENE-CHARGE system and ECO-COOL, implemented from the Suzuki Wagon R. The new DUAL JET ENGINE uses the dual-injection system on its 1.2-litre petrol engine and it works by increasing vaporisation, making combustion more efficient. It channels fuel to two intake ports instead of only one per cylinder. With the Dualjet technology and the ENE-CHARGE, fuel economy is now up to 26.4 km/L, calculated based on JC08 mode.

Swift Sport (AZG416; 2012–2017) 
The Swift Sport was previewed by the Swift S-Concept which was showcased first at the 2011 Australian International Motor Show. The 2012 model comes with the option of a six-speed manual transmission or a high performance CVT transmission with seven-speed manual mode and paddle shifters.

Riding on lightweight 17-inch alloys, the car now features a rear spoiler, a large front grille, body kit, new HID headlights and rear lighting clusters. The ground clearance is also lower than the normal version. Inside, designers included leather bucket seats with sporty red stitching and a "Sport" mark, a new steering wheel, and different instrumentation.

In January 2014, The Swift Sport was updated to include a 6.1inch combined satnav/dab radio infotainment touchscreen as standard.

In the United Kingdom, Suzuki has released another special edition of the Swift, the SZ-R, with a list price of £14,249 and limited to just 100 units. In August 2014, Suzuki launched this vehicle for Brazilian market simply as Swift Sport R. It has higher engine output, claimed producing .

Safety 
Global NCAP (2014, similar to Latin NCAP 2013, no airbags - Indian market) - 
Latin NCAP (2014, Indian-made most basic Latin American version)- 
 Euro NCAP (2010) - 
 ANCAP (2011) - 
ASEAN NCAP (2013) -

Third generation (A2L; 2017) 

The third generation Swift debuted in Japan on 27 December 2016. The hatchback is built on the HEARTECT platform which made its debut in 2015 and is the same lightweight platform used for the production of the hatchbacks Baleno and Ignis. This new lightweight platform made the third generation Swift roughly 10% lighter than the previous generation. Only 5-door body style is available, even though the car looks like a 3-door because the rear door handles are moved to the C-pillar. Despite having similar size as the previous generation (10 mm shorter, 10 mm lower, 40 mm wider and 20 mm longer wheelbase), the boot space is also roughly 20% more spacious (now 246 litres, up to 579 liters when the rear seats are folded), but still smaller than its competitors.

This generation is also the first that uses the newly developed Boosterjet direct injection turbocharged petrol engines and Smart Hybrid Vehicle by Suzuki (SHVS) mild hybrid technologies. The compact and lightweight 12 or 48-volt mild hybrid system features a belt-driven Integrated Starter Generator (ISG), which assists the engine during acceleration and helps recoup energy via regenerative braking. In Japan, a 48-volt full hybrid model is available for the 1.25-litre four-cylinder petrol engine, it is connected to a Motor Generator Unit (MGU) and 5-speed clutchless automated manual transmission (AGS).

Additional safety kits are also updated, such as; a forward-facing camera and laser sensors that deliver lane departure warning and high-beam assist, along with autonomous emergency braking.

The European market Swift is no longer built by Magyar Suzuki in Hungary, it is now supplied from Japan and also exported to areas including Asia, Oceania and Latin America. It is also manufactured in India, Thailand and Myanmar. The Indian built Swift is exported to Africa, some part of Asia, some part of Latin America and Middle East. The third generation Swift is also manufactured in Pakistan and Ghana since 2022 and 2023, respectively.

Facelift 
The Suzuki Swift received a minor facelift in May 2020 for the Japanese market. European market received the facelifted model in September 2020. It was also released in November 2020 for the Mexican market, in February 2021 for the Thai and Indian market, and in the Philippine market in March 2022.

The hatchback received new radiator grille, alloy wheels and dual tone colour option. Some features from the higher trim now become available for lower trims, some markets also received new features from other markets which was standard in the pre-facelift model. The engine is also revised for markets with stricter emission standards (see below). The 12-volt mild hybrid system has also been upgraded with a bigger 10Ah battery, replacing the old 3Ah unit to boost energy recovery.

Swift Sport (A2L414)
Suzuki officially unveiled the Swift Sport at the 2017 Frankfurt Motor Show. It comes equipped with either a 6-speed manual or a 6-speed automatic transmission. Aesthetically, the Swift Sport has a completely new front and rear bumpers, a rear spoiler, 16 or 17-inch alloy wheels, dual exhaust, wider tyres, a front chin spoiler and red accents interior.

For Italian market, a limited edition Swift Sport BeeRacing was launched in March 2018. In June of the same year, 100 units limited edition Swift Sport, called the Red Devil was announced for Australian market.

In May 2019, a limited edition Swift Sport Katana was launched for Dutch market only. The limited edition hot hatch pays tribute to the new Suzuki Katana 1000 bike. Built in a limited run of only 30 units, it comes in two colours, 15 units Premium Silver Metallic and 15 units Super Black Pearl paints.

In June 2020, Suzuki launched Swift Sport with Suzuki's SHVS 48-volt mild hybrid technology for European market to meet Euro 6d emission standard. Still with the 1.4-litre turbocharged engine (now called K14D Boosterjet), revised with dual VVT and smaller turbocharger. This version is also available in Singapore, Taiwan, Hong Kong and Macau.

Another limited edition for Italian market was launched in February 2021 to celebrate Suzuki MotoGP's 7th world championship title after Joan Mir won the 2020 MotoGP season. Dubbed as the World Champion Edition and only 7 unit were available for sale.

In 2019, Japanese car tunner Tommykaira launched tuned car based on Swift Sport called the m14, 12 years after the first generation Swift Sport-based S-Ss was introduced, collaborated with a Suzuki's dealership in 2007. Three packages are available; Stage I, Stage II and Stage III.

Special and limited editions
Similar special or limited editions of Swift with Japanese market honeycomb grille, front and rear spoiler, sidekirts, decals (depending on the markets) and additional accessories were launched in India, Philippines, South Africa, Australia, United Kingdom and several other markets.

A special edition based on XG trim called XR Limited was launched for Japanese market in October 2018. The car received sporty exterior package from RS trim, additional "Suzuki Safety Support" safety kits and several comfort features from higher trim. Another limited edition based on the updated XG trim was launched in November 2019, called the Hybrid MG Limited. Basically the car has similar package as the previous limited edition but without sporty RS trim bumpers and additional mild hybrid system as standard.

In Thailand, a special edition called Swift GL Max Edition was launched in November 2020. Equipped with black coloured body kit, crossover-like flare fenders, shark fin antenna and decorated quad exhaust pipes. Another special edition with different body kit called GL Plus was launched in August 2021 and limited edition with upgraded body kit called GL Plus Limitless Edition was launched in June 2022.

In New Zealand, limited editions called SR, SR2 and SR3 with similar concept as the previous generations Swift were available from 2018 to 2021. The most notable changes were the wider 205/45 sport tires and 17-inch black alloy wheels.

Powertrain

As standard, all engines are mated with a 5-speed manual transmission (6-speed for Swift Sport), this transmission is also standard for mild hybrid (pre-facelift) and AWD (1.25-litre only) models in Europe. The 1.25-litre engine can be selected with CVT transmission option and the 6-speed automatic transmission option is available exclusively for the turbocharged engines.

For the Japanese market, the 1.25-litre K12C Dualjet engine is offered in three variants; regular petrol engine, mild hybrid and full hybrid, depending on the trim levels. Unlike in Europe, the AWD model can be ordered with CVT transmission option and the full hybrid model is only available with a 5-speed clutchless automated manual transmission (AGS). The 1.0-litre turbocharged engine was also offered in RSt trim until May 2020 and only available with automatic transmission.

In India though, it is expected to come equipped the familiar  1.2-litre 4-cylinder K12M petrol engine and a  1.25-litre Fiat-sourced (D13A) turbodiesel engine variant from the previous generations. The former is also available in Latin America, Caribbean, Africa, Middle East and several Asian countries; while the latter was only available for Indian market and discontinued in April 2020.

The Thai-market third generation Swift received the reworked 1.2-litre K12M engine with Dualjet technology in February 2018.

For the 2021 European model, due the implementation of Euro 6d emission standard, both 1.0-litre turbocharged and 1.25-litre engines were replaced by a brand new 1.2-litre K12D Dualjet dual VVT engine with 12-volt mild hybrid system and become standard engine in Europe. This engine is also available for the facelifted Swift in New Zealand, Singapore, Taiwan, Hong Kong and Macau. In February 2021, the facelifted Indian market Swift received a brand new BS6 compliant 1.2-litre K12N Dualjet dual VVT engine.

Several countries in Latin America received K12C Dualjet mild hybrid engine option in November 2021, the engine is only available with a 5-speed manual transmission.

In August 2022, Maruti Suzuki launched CNG version of K12N Dualjet engine in India.

Safety 
 Global NCAP
(2018, similar to Latin NCAP 2013, Indian market) - 
(2022, with new protocol, Indian market) - 
Latin NCAP (2021, similar to Euro NCAP 2014, Indian-made most basic Latin American version with 2 airbags) - 
 Euro NCAP (2017, Japanese-made)
With safety pack - 
Standard - 
 ANCAP (2017, Japanese-made)
Base model - 
Top model - 
 JNCAP (in Japanese) - 
ASEAN NCAP (2018, Thai-made) -

Sedan version 

A sub 4-meter notchback sedan version of Swift developed by Maruti Suzuki was introduced in March 2008 in India and marketed as Dzire (Swift Dzire for the first two generations) or Swift Sedan depending on the market. The car is positioned below the SX4 sedan and later Ciaz subcompact sedans and also the successor of Cultus-based Swift sedan. Despite designed to suit Indian sub 4-meter car tax bracket (the first generation was above 4 meters), it is also exported to developing markets in Asia, Africa and Latin America.

Swift EV concepts 
The Suzuki Swift Plug-in hybrid concept car was unveiled at the 2009 Tokyo Motor Show. The Swift Plug-in concept has an all-electric range of about  drawing on a lithium-ion battery pack. When the battery is running low a small 0.66 L engine kicks in to power a generator that charges the battery.

In May 2010, Suzuki announced a demonstration program with 60 Swift Plug-in hybrids in Japan scheduled to start by late 2010. Initially sales of the Suzuki Swift plug-in hybrid electric vehicle were scheduled to begin by 2013.

Average fuel consumption, calculated by combining fuel consumption during operation on electric power from grid charge and fuel consumption during hybrid operation after depletion of the battery pack is 37.6 km/L on the JC08 cycle (88.4 mpg US, or 2.7 L/100 km). Grid charge time for the battery is approximately 1.5 hours @ 100 V and 1 h at 200 V.

In March 2014, Maruti Suzuki announced that it will provide several copies of the production version, renamed "Swift Range Extender" as part of a pilot project to be conducted in partnership with the Indian government during 2014 to 2015. The battery takes nearly 90 minutes to get fully charged. Maruti is awaiting for the implementation of India's National Electric Mobility Mission Plan 2020, which will define the government's purchase incentives for plug-in electric cars.

Nameplate use with other vehicles 
From 1995 to 2001, the Suzuki Swift nameplate was reused for the second generation Geo Metro in the United States and Canada. It was still based on the previous generation Cultus/Swift's platform and only available as a 3-door hatchback.

In 2003, the first generation 5-door hatchback Chevrolet Aveo was marketed in Canada as Suzuki Swift+ and discontinued in 2011.

Motorsport 

The Suzuki Swift Sport is well known for being competitive in rallying, especially under 2.0-liter class. In 2007 and 2010, Per-Gunnar Andersson and Aaron Burkart won the JWRC S1600 rally class and also dominating the top three from 2006 to 2010. In 2009, Luke Pinder won the British Rally Championship R1 class. The Swift Sport also successful in All-Japan Rally Championship (ja), it won in JN1 class from 2016 to 2018 and later the JN4 class from 2019 to 2022. In Italy, the Swift has been used for Suzuki Rally Cup since 2007 and followed by Rally Italia Talent since 2019.

In 2019, Michael Hopp and Steve Pittman it won the 2019 Hi-Tec Oils Bathurst 6 Hour E class, finished at 21st place with 113 laps. In 2021 (after the 2020 Bathurst 6 Hour was cancelled due to COVID-19), Ian Cowley, Daniel Natoli & Matt Thewlis finished 2nd 2021 Hi-Tec Oils Bathurst 6 Hour Class E and Michael Hopp, Steve McHugh & Michael Rice finished 3rd 2021 Hi-Tec Oils Bathurst 6 Hour Class E, a double podium for the TEAM Group Suzuki Racing Team.

They are also used in the British RallyCross, where they form both their own category, and the car, all drivers in the 14 to 17 year old Junior category must use. As of 2022, there are 12 Juniors and 8 Senior Swifts.

Javier Pardo and co-driver Adrián Pérez from Suzuki Motor Ibérica won the 2021 European Rally Championship in the ERC-2 category by winning all the six rally events in which they were participated.

Sales 
Sales of the Swift had reached cumulative worldwide sales of 6 million units in May 2018. In India, ever since its launch in 2005, the Swift steadily increased its sales in line with the market expansion due to economic growth. Of the 6 million units, units sold in India account for approximately 54% of them. Also, approximately 17% were sold in Europe and approximately 10% were sold in Japan. By June 2008, cumulative sales of the Swift reached 1 million, 2 million in January 2011, 3 million in January 2013, 4 million in August 2014, 5 million in April 2016 and 6 million in May 2018.

In September 2021, Swift's total sales reached 2.5 million units in India.

Awards 
The Suzuki Swift has won more than 60 Awards including car of the year awards since its introduction as a global model.
 Most fun to drive car in Japan car of the year awards 2006
 RJC Japan car of the year 2006, 2011 and 2018
 Indian car of the year 2012
 2011 small car of the year by BBC Top Gear India
 Goldstar award by Wheels magazine Australia
 Best buy hot hatchback by Whatcar magazine UK for Swift Sport
 Best model in city cars by L'argus magazine France
 2011 Small car of the year by AMI insurance autocar magazine New Zealand
Best Small Hatchback award by Otomotif magazine Indonesia 2013, 2014 and 2015
 Best Small Car' by the Association of Scottish Motoring Writers in Scottish Car of the Year Awards 2010
 Indian Car of the year 2019
2019 The Budget Car of the Year award by Cars.co.za South Africa

References

External links 
 
  (Swift)
  (Swift Sport)

2000s cars
All-wheel-drive vehicles
Cars introduced in 2000
ANCAP superminis
ASEAN NCAP superminis
Euro NCAP superminis
Global NCAP superminis
Latin NCAP superminis
Front-wheel-drive vehicles
Hatchbacks
Plug-in hybrid vehicles
Rally cars
Sedans
Subcompact cars
Suzuki vehicles